La Vache et le Prisonnier (English version: "The Cow and I") is a French-Italian tragicomedy film from 1959, starring Fernandel and directed by Henri Verneuil, that is based on Jacques Antoine's 1945 novel, Une histoire vraie (A True Story). It tells the story of a French prisoner of war in World War II forced to work on a farm in Germany who decides to escape by walking away with a cow he calls Marguerite (Daisy in English).

The most successful film in France in 1959, with over 8 million seats sold, it was also the most successful film of Fernandel's career.

Plot
Charles Bailly, a French prisoner of war in Germany in the summer of 1943, decides to escape from the farm where he is forced to work and go home to France. Observing that a man with a cow and a milk pail passes unnoticed in the Bavarian countryside, his plan is to take one (whom he names Marguerite) and to walk with her to Stuttgart, where he will leave her and hide aboard a train for France.

Their epic journey takes weeks, during which the two meet many people, some sympathetic and some not. They get into many situations, some dangerous and some hilarious. For example, on a narrow pontoon bridge over the Danube, Marguerite will not budge when a company of German soldiers tries to cross.

Reaching Stuttgart, Bailly has to part from Marguerite and jumps on a train. At its first stop in France, he gets off but is challenged by French police. To escape them he jumps on another train, which viewers can see is heading for Stuttgart.

Cast
 Fernandel : Charles Bailly
 René Havard : Bussière, fellow prisoner on the farm
 Bernard Musson : Pommier, fellow prisoner on the farm
 Maurice Nasil : Bertoux, fellow prisoner on the farm
 Albert Rémy : Collinet
 Ellen Schwiers : Josépha, the farmer's daughter
 Ingeborg Schöner : Helga, another farmer's daughter 
 Franziska Kinz : Helga's mother
 Pierre-Louis : an escaped prisoner in disguise
 Richard Winckler : another escaped prisoner in disguise
 Benno Hoffmann : a prison guard
 Franz Muxeneder
 Heinrich Gretler
 Marguerite : the cow

Production
The film was shot in black and white, and in 1990 a colorized version was released.

Reception
The film has become a national favourite, being shown often on television. Analysing its enduring popularity, a critic in 2017 wrote that the character created by Fernandel embodies:  .. the typical Frenchman, in his stubbornness, resourcefulness and humanity.

References

External links
 
 http://filmsdefrance.com/FDF_La_vache_et_le_prisonnier_rev.html

1950s war comedy films
1959 films
Tragicomedy films
Films set in France
Films set in Germany
World War II prisoner of war films
Films based on French novels
Films about cattle
Films set in 1943
Films directed by Henri Verneuil
French black-and-white films
Italian black-and-white films
French war comedy films
Italian war comedy films
French World War II films
Italian World War II films
1950s French films
1950s Italian films